Juneau County is a county located in the U.S. state of Wisconsin. As of the 2020 census, the population was 26,718. Its county seat is Mauston.

History

Before white settlement, before loggers and explorers, the area that is now Juneau County was the home of Native Americans who left behind artifacts like the thunderbirds etched on the wall at Twin Bluffs and the Gee's Slough mounds outside New Lisbon.

Juneau County was established in 1857 when the Wisconsin Legislature passed legislation separating lands west of the Wisconsin River from what was then Adams County. After a contest with neighboring New Lisbon, the county seat was established in Maugh's Town, which is known today as Mauston. The county was named after Solomon Juneau, a founder of Milwaukee.

Geography

Major highways

Railroads
Canadian National
Canadian Pacific
Union Pacific

Buses
List of intercity bus stops in Wisconsin

Airports
 Necedah Airport (KDAF), serves the county and surrounding communities.
 Mauston–New Lisbon Union Airport (82C) enhances county service.

Adjacent counties
 Wood County - north
 Adams County - east
 Columbia County - southeast
 Sauk County - south
 Vernon County - southwest
 Monroe County - west
 Jackson County - northwest

National protected area
 Necedah National Wildlife Refuge

United States Military Posts
 Volk Field Air National Guard Base
Fort McCoy outside of Juneau county

Demographics

2020 census
As of the census of 2020, the population was 26,718. The racial makeup of the county was 90.9% White, 2.1% Black or African American, 1.4% Native American, 0.6% Asian, 0.9% from other races, and 4.1% from two or more races. Ethnically, the population was 2.7% Hispanic or Latino of any race.

2000 census

As of the census of 2000, there were 24,316 people, 9,696 households, and 6,699 families residing in the county. The population density was 32 people per square mile (12/km2). There were 12,370 housing units at an average density of 16 per square mile (6/km2). The racial makeup of the county was 96.61% White, 0.33% Black or African American, 1.30% Native American, 0.44% Asian, 0.02% Pacific Islander, 0.57% from other races, and 0.74% from two or more races. 1.43% of the population were Hispanic or Latino of any race. 41.2% were of German, 9.9% Irish, 8.8% Norwegian, 6.5% Polish and 5.8% English ancestry.

There were 9,696 households, out of which 30.4% had children under the age of 18 living with them, 55.5% were married couples living together, 8.8% had a female householder with no husband present, and 30.9% were non-families. 26.0% of all households were made up of individuals, and 12.30% had someone living alone who was 65 years of age or older. The average household size was 2.47 and the average family size was 2.96.

In the county, the population was spread out, with 25.4% under the age of 18, 6.9% from 18 to 24, 26.6% from 25 to 44, 24.3% from 45 to 64, and 16.8% who were 65 years of age or older. The median age was 39 years. For every 100 females there were 100.1 males. For every 100 females age 18 and over, there were 97.4 males.

In 2017, there were 282 births, giving a general fertility rate of 72.7 births per 1000 women aged 15–44, the 12th highest rate out of all 72 Wisconsin counties. Of these, only 2 of the births occurred at home. Additionally, there were 16 reported induced abortions performed on women of Juneau County residence in 2017, a figure higher than the records for the preceding four years.

Communities

Cities
 Elroy
 Mauston (county seat)
 New Lisbon
 Wisconsin Dells (mostly in Columbia County, Adams County, and Sauk County)

Villages
 Camp Douglas
 Hustler
 Lyndon Station
 Necedah
 Union Center
 Wonewoc

Towns

 Armenia
 Clearfield
 Cutler
 Finley
 Fountain
 Germantown
 Kildare
 Kingston
 Lemonweir
 Lindina
 Lisbon
 Lyndon
 Marion
 Necedah
 Orange
 Plymouth
 Seven Mile Creek
 Summit
 Wonewoc

Unincorporated communities

 Cloverdale
 Cutler
 Finley
 Indian Heights
 Kelly
 Lemonweir
 Lindina
 Lone Rock
 Mather
 Meadow Valley
 New Miner
 Orange Mill
 Sprague

Politics

Juneau County can be considered a bellwether in presidential elections. From 1964 through 2016, the winning candidate has carried the county in every presidential election.

See also
 National Register of Historic Places listings in Juneau County, Wisconsin

References

Further reading
 Biographical History of La Crosse, Monroe and Juneau Counties, Wisconsin. Chicago: Lewis Publishing Company, 1892.

External links
 Juneau County government website
 Juneau County map from the Wisconsin Department of Transportation
 Juneau County Economic Development website
 Juneau County Health and Demographic Data
 Wisconsin Hometown Stories: Juneau County Documentary produced by PBS Wisconsin

 
1857 establishments in Wisconsin
Populated places established in 1857